Florin Ignat (born 26 February 1982), is a Romanian futsal player who plays for City'us and the Romanian national futsal team.

References

External links
UEFA profile
Futsalplanet profile

1982 births
Living people
Romanian men's futsal players
Sportspeople from Galați